Mervyn Douglas Collins (August 10, 1933 – June 12, 2019) was a Canadian football player who played for the Toronto Argonauts, Hamilton Tiger-Cats, Ottawa Rough Riders and Edmonton Eskimos. He won the Grey Cup with Ottawa in 1960. He owned a paving company in Toronto and later was a teacher.

References

1933 births
2019 deaths
Edmonton Elks players
Ottawa Rough Riders players